Romeo and Juliet is ballet created by John Cranko to Sergei Prokofiev's eponymous score for the Stuttgart Ballet in 1962 and first seen in America in 1969. The Joffrey Ballet presented the first American production of Cranko's choreography in its 1984–1985 season, including performances in New York City at the New York State Theater and in Washington, D.C. at the Kennedy Center.

Casts

Stuttgart Ballet 
  
 Original

Marcia Haydée Juliet

Ray Barra Romeo

  
 American premiere

Marcia Haydée Juliet

Richard Cragun Romeo

Joffrey Ballet 

 
 1985

Patricia Miller Juliet
Deborah Dawn Rosalind
Charlene Gehm Lady Capulet

James Canfield Romeo
Luis Perez Mercutio
Jerel Hilding Tybalt
Tom Mossbrucker Paris

Reviews 
NY Times, by Anna Kisselgoff, Thursday, 7 March 1985

External links 
 Joffrey Ballet

Ballets by John Cranko
Ballets by Sergei Prokofiev
1962 ballet premieres
Ballets based on Romeo and Juliet